The Bog Wallow Ambush was a small unit action during the American Civil War that took place between Confederate forces under Captain J. Fred. Waring and Union forces under Colonel George W. Taylor on December 4, 1861, in Fairfax County, Virginia, as part of Maj. Gen. George B. McClellan's operations in northern Virginia.  The Union force set up an ambush for the Confederate force on the Braddock Road.  The action resulted in a Union victory.

Background
Following the Battle of Ball's Bluff on October 21, 1861, major offensive action was halted in the eastern theater, as both armies went into winter quarters.  Small detachments were still occasionally sent out to probe the enemy's position and to obtain forage. On the night of November 5, 1861, a shootout occurred between members of the units later involved in the ambush at Oak Hill mansion, in an area of such probing and patrolling. Members of the Union force also intended to retaliate for the Confederate force's attacks on Union pickets.

Opposing forces

Confederate

Commander: J. Fred. Waring

Georgia Hussars (later Jeff Davis Cavalry Legion, Company 'F')

Union

Commander: Col George W. Taylor

3rd New Jersey Volunteer Infantry, part of the First New Jersey Brigade

The action
On December 4, 1861, 3rd New Jersey Infantry troops stretched two telegraph wires across Braddock Road at the eastern end of a "perfect bog hole" to dismount riders of the Georgia Hussars in the middle of the night. A "sheet of fire" erupted from the tree line along the swamp's edge when this happened; the Confederates returned fire and escaped, with casualties on both sides.

Results
This was a small unit action of no strategic importance and resulted in only light casualties.  However, it is representative of many such actions in northern Virginia during the early part of the American Civil War.

Commemoration
A new historic marker was unveiled May 5, 2013 at the intersection of Braddock Road and Dunleigh Drive in Burke to commemorate the “Bog Wallow Ambush.” The marker is just outside Annandale, between Rolling Road and Guinea Road.

Notes

References

Salmon, John S. The Official Virginia Civil War Battlefield Guide.Stackpole Books; Mechanicsburg, Pa. 2001.
Evans, Thomas J and James M. Moyer. Mosby's Confederacy:A Guide to the Roads and Sites of Colonel John Singleton Mosby.  White Mane Publishing Company, Inc.  Shippensburg, Pa.  1991.

External links
 Bog Wallow Ambush Historical Marker Fairfax County History Commission
 A Look Back at Braddock District Fairfax County, Virginia Historical Marker: Bog Wallow Ambush
 A Look Back at Braddock District Fairfax County, Bog Wallow Ambush on Braddock Road
 Annandale VA Historic marker commemorates Bog Wallow Ambush

Battles for McClellan's Operations in Northern Virginia of the American Civil War
Battles of the Eastern Theater of the American Civil War
Union victories of the American Civil War
Fairfax County in the American Civil War
1861 in Virginia
1861 in the American Civil War
Battles of the American Civil War in Virginia
December 1861 events
Conflicts in 1861